Sport shooting at the 2019 Games of the Small States of Europe was held at the SC Rea and Shooting Range in Budva from 29 to 31 May 2019.

Medal table

Medalists

Men

Women

References 

Games of the Small States of Europe
Shooting
2019
Shooting sports in Montenegro